Gideon Johannes Stegmann (born 22 March 1986) is a South African professional rugby union player, who most recently played as an openside flank for Honda Heat in the Japanese Top League. He made his Super 14 debut for the Bulls in 2008 at the age of 21.

Stegmann is a classic fetcher with a low centre of gravity who is thriving under the new law interpretations- and his anticipation, together with his toughness, is a huge asset for the Bulls. He made the number 6 jersey his own in 2008 after playing in every Super 14 match and being awarded Bulls Forward of the Year in 2008.

His grandpa is famous springbok player Johannes Augustus Stegmann. He has been one of the Super Rugby's best openside flankers from 2008 to 2011. 
He is one of the hardest-working players in the Bulls' squad, as well as a superb team player with a very high work rate, regularly leading the tackle count, turnover and work rate stats for the Bulls. He has a time of 10.8 seconds in the 100-metre sprint.

At the Bulls, Stegmann plays in a back row combination together with Springbok flank, Dewald Potgieter and Springbok number 8, Pierre Spies, winning 2 Super 14 titles in 2 successive years as well as the Currie Cup.

In 2013, he signed a contract extension to keep him at the  until 2015.

Education
Stegmann attended South Africa's top-ranked rugby school: Grey College, Bloemfontein, where he was selected for the SA schools team. During high school he was a track and field athlete and played number 8 (as well as flank) in Grey College's First XV loose trio, alongside Springbok and Cheetahs flank Heinrich Brüssow, and Cheetahs now Irish international flank Richardt Strauss. Tertiary education: UNISA.

Springbok career
In November 2010, Stegmann was called up to the Springbok squad (outgoing tours) as a replacement to injured Springbok flank and former IRB player of the year Schalk Burger, and was handed his first cap as a Springbok debutant in the starting lineup named to face Ireland on 6 November 2010. The Springboks won and Stegmann subsequently started every match on tour. South Africa obtained a result of 3–1 over the Isles, beating England and Wales and losing to Scotland.

Squads

 Free State (U/18 Craven Week) – 2004
 Vodacom Blue Bulls (Vodacom Cup) – 2005
 Blue Bulls (SA Under 19) – 2005
 Blue Bulls (ABSA Under 21) – 2006
 Vodacom Blue Bulls (Vodacom Cup) – 2007
 Vodacom Blue Bulls (ABSA Currie Cup Premier Div) – 2007
 Vodacom Bulls (Super 14) – 2008
 Vodacom Blue Bulls (ABSA Currie Cup Premier Div) – 2008
 Vodacom Bulls (Super 14) – 2009
 Vodacom Blue Bulls (ABSA Currie Cup Premier Div) – 2009
 Vodacom Bulls (Super 14) – 2010
 South Africa (Outgoing Tours) – 2010
 Vodacom Bulls (Super Rugby) - 2011
 South Africa (Castle Tri Nations) - 2011
 Vodacom Blue Bulls (ABSA Currie Cup Premier Div) - 2011
 Vodacom Bulls (Super 15) - 2012

References

External links
Bulls profile

rugby.com.au profile
itsrugby.co.uk profile

1986 births
Living people
People from Cradock, Eastern Cape
South African rugby union players
Bulls (rugby union) players
Blue Bulls players
South Africa international rugby union players
Rugby union flankers
Afrikaner people
Alumni of Grey College, Bloemfontein
Mie Honda Heat players
South African expatriate rugby union players
Expatriate rugby union players in Japan
South African expatriate sportspeople in Japan
Rugby union players from the Eastern Cape